Sir Roy Burman Grounds (18 December 19052 March 1981) was an Australian architect. His early work included buildings influenced by the Moderne movement of the 1930s, and his later buildings of the 1950s and 1960s, such as the National Gallery of Victoria and the adjacent Victorian Arts Centre, cemented his legacy as a leader in Australian architecture.

Artist Marr Grounds was his son.

Early life and education
Born on 18 December 1905 in Melbourne, Grounds was educated at several schools,  including Scotch College Melbourne and Melbourne Church of England Grammar School.

In the mid 1920s, he began his articles with the architectural firm of Blackett, Forster and Craig, where Geoffrey Mewton was doing the same. By 1928 they were both studying at the University of Melbourne Architectural Atelier, where they won first prize in an Institute of Architects Exhibition for a house costing under £1000. They both also won scholarships to further their studies later that year.

After graduating in 1928 they travelled to London together with another student, Oscar Bayne, where they all shared digs. After working in London for a while, Grounds then worked in the United States for two years. It was there that his son, Marr Grounds was born.

Career
On his return to Australia in 1932, Grounds shared an office with Mewton, who had already set up a solo practice the previous year, where they worked on projects separately, but published under "Mewton & Grounds". One of their first projects that is attributed to Grounds was radically modern for Melbourne - located in the hills of Upper Beaconsfield, Wildfell, built in 1933, was a long flat roofed rectilinear composition of white painted brick, with red and cream brick details and corner windows. This was followed in 1934 by the Milky Way Cafe in Little Collins Street, a venture of the United Milk Producers Society to encourage milk consumption, with modern tubular steel furniture and flush recessed lighting panels. While Mewton produced many designs in a Modernism combining the brick volumes of Willem Dudok with European Bauhaus starkness, Grounds' distinctive work was influenced by the simple, rough modernism of US West Coast architect William Wurster. The most notable expression of this influence are a series of houses including Portland Lodge, Lyncroft and the Ramsay House, all on the Mornington Peninsula, the Fairbairn House in Toorak and the house for the Chateau Tahbilk winery.

Grounds also designed in a more Streamline Moderne style, with his own family holiday house on the peninsula  nicknamed "The Ship" due to its long horizontal asbestos-cement sheet flat forms topped by a pipe railing and a glass walled lookout, and the similarly styled Rosanove House in nearby Frankston.

In about 1937, Grounds ended the partnership with Mewton, spending time in England again until 1939.

Grounds returned and established a solo practice between 1939 and 1942, and designed a series of unusually modern flat developments in the Toorak area which further established his reputation as a modernist:  Moonbria, with its balustrades topped with Swedish blue tiles  and Quamby 1939-41, both situated in Toorak, are buildings which consist of studio, one or two-bedroom apartments. 

During World War II he served in the Royal Australian Air Force (1942-45) as a Flight Lieutenant, performing works and camouflage duties. After the war, Grounds retired for a few years, returning in 1951 as a senior lecturer at the School of Architecture at Melbourne University. In 1953, he resumed his architectural practice and produced a series of houses, including his own, based on pure geometric shapes. The Leyser House was triangular, the Henty House was circular, and his own house was square, with a central circular courtyard. This theme was repeated in later projects, including the circular Round House in Hobart, and the square Master's Lodge at Ormond College.

When Grounds, Frederick Romberg and Robin Boyd formed their partnership in 1953 all were well established in Victoria. Each brought substantial work to the practice, which they usually worked on separately, and the firm became very successful.

Grounds' first large commission was for the Australian Academy of Science in Canberra. The construction of its reinforced concrete dome was a considerable technical achievement. Opened in 1959, it won the Meritorious Architecture Award of the Canberra Area Committee of the Royal Australian Institute of Architects (RAIA) and the Sulman Award for Architectural Merit. The Academy building also led to other work in Canberra, initially for the firm and later Grounds himself. Grounds opened a Canberra office in the Forrest Townhouses (1959), which he designed and partly financed.

In 1959 the firm was awarded the commission to design the National Gallery of Victoria and Arts Centre, with Grounds named in the contract as the architect in charge. When Boyd and Romberg were mildly critical of the preliminary geometric designs that Grounds showed them, relations between the partners became strained, and in 1962 Grounds left the partnership, taking the commission with him and setting up his own company with Oscar Bayne.

Under a building committee chaired by the philanthropist Ken Myer, Grounds devoted the next twenty years of his life to the completion of the Arts Centre. His longest-serving architectural associates throughout this period were Alan Nelson, Fritz Suendermann, Lou Gerhardt and Allan Stillman. While the gallery was brought in on time and budget, the complicated Yarra River site for the Concert Hall and Theatre Complex resulted in building delays and criticism. Unlike the fate that befell Jørn Utzon on the Sydney Opera House project, Grounds managed to hold on to his commission from the Victorian Government despite tumult within his company in the late 1970s. Grounds showed Queen Elizabeth II the massive excavations shortly before his death. Much of the theatres' interior designs were completed by John Truscott after Grounds' death.

One of his last designs was Hobart's iconic 18-story octagonal tower and Wrest Point Hotel Casino complex.

Recognition and honours
1959: RAIA Meritorious Architecture Award
1959: Sulman Award for Architectural Merit
1968: RAIA Gold Medal, Royal Australian Institute of Architects
1969: Knighted by Queen Elizabeth II
1969: elected a life fellow of the RAIA

Death and legacy
Grounds died on 2 March 1981.

His early work included buildings influenced by the Moderne movement of the 1930s, and his later buildings of the 1950s and 1960s, such as the National Gallery of Victoria and the adjacent Victorian Arts Centre, cemented his legacy as a leader in Australian architecture.

In 2011, with the opening of the Museum of Old and New Art (MONA) in Hobart, Tasmania, two houses designed and built there by Grounds in 1957–8 for Claudio Alcorso on the Moorilla Estate—the Courtyard House and the Round House—became respectively the entrance and the library of Australia's largest private museum.

Family and personal life
Grounds married Regina Marr, an American divorcee (aka Virginia Lammers; Marr was her maiden name). Their son, artist Marr Grounds, was born in Los Angeles in 1930.

There was not a close relationship between father and son, and the parents split in 1939 and divorced a couple of years later in 1941. Roy Grounds created a scandal when he left his wife for the wife of Tom Ramsay, Alice Bettine Ramsay. Ramsay (son of William Ramsay) was known as "Mr Kiwi Boot Polish". The Grounds family lived in the affluent suburb of Toorak at the time.

Marr was married to artist Joan Grounds for some time, and died in New South Wales in 2021. Although he lectured in architecture, he never practised as an architect. He was known for his sculpture, and for co-founding the art workshop Tin Sheds at Sydney University with Donald Brook.

Key works
Mewton & Grounds

Attributed to both but likely Grounds:

 'Portland Lodge', Henty House, 1 Plummer Avenue Olivers Hill, Frankston (c1935) (this is adjacent to his 1953 Henty House)
 Fairbairn House, 236 Kooyong Road, Toorak VIC (1935–36)
 Flats, 2-6 North Road, Brighton VIC (1936) Altered.
 House, 493 Kooyong Road, Elsternwick (1936)
Attributed to Grounds:
'The Ship' (Grounds' family house), 35 Rannoch Avenue, Mt Eliza (1935)
Rosanove House, 12 Gould Street Frankston (c1935, demolished)
Lyncroft, 410 Tucks Road, Shoreham (1935)
Chateau Tahbilk homestead, 254 O'Neils Road, Tahbilk (1935)
Thomas House, 12 Reid Street Balwyn, (c1935, demolished)
Ramsay House, 2 Rendelsham Avenue, Mt Eliza (1937)
2nd Milky Way cafe, 175 Collins Street (1937)

Roy Grounds

Clendon Flats, 13 Clendon Road, Armadale (1939-1940)
Moonbria Flats, 68 Mathoura Road, Toorak (1939-1941)
Quamby Flats, 3 Glover Court, Toorak (1939-1941)
Clendon Corner, Armadale (1939-1941)
Leyser House, Kew (1952) Altered.
Grounds House and flats, 24 Hill Street, Toorak (1953)
Henty House (Round house), 581 Nepean Highway, Olivers Hill, Frankston South (1953)

Grounds Romberg & Boyd

Currawong Ski Lodge, 13 Jack Adams Pathway, Thredbo NSW (1957)
Mirrabooka, 30-34 Moore Road, Vermont, Melbourne
The Courtyard House (1957) and The Round House (1958), Moorilla Estate (both now part of The Museum of Old and New Art), 655 Main Rd, Berriedale, Hobart
Masters Lodge, Ormond College, Melbourne University (1958)
Vice Masters Lodge (alterations), Ormond College, Melbourne University (1958)
Australian Academy of Science (Shine Dome), 15 Gordon St, Acton, Canberra (1959)
Forrest Townhouses, 3 Tasmania Circle, Forrest (1959)
Vasey Crescent Houses, 42, 44 and 46 Vasey Crescent, Campbell (1960)
McNicoll House, 19 Gordon Grove, South Yarra (1962-3).

Roy Grounds & Co. Pty. Ltd.

CSIRO Phytotron Building, Clunies Ross Street, Acton (1963)
Botany Building (D.A. Brown Building), Australian National University, Acton Campus, Canberra (1968)

National Gallery of Victoria, 200 St Kilda Road, Melbourne (1959–68)
 National Gallery Art School and West Garden for outdoor sculptures, Nolan Street, Melbourne (1968-69)
Medley Building, Melbourne University (1968-71)
Frankel House, 4 Cobby Street, Campbell (1969-70)
Robert Blackwood Hall, Monash University, Victoria (1968-1971)
Swan Hill Pioneer Settlement & Folk Museum expansion, Swan Hill, Victoria (early 1970s)
Nicholas families homes, 22 Hill Street, Toorak, Melbourne (c1970) much altered.
Wrest Point Hotel Casino, Hobart, Tasmania (1973)
Arts Centre Melbourne, 100 St Kilda Road, Melbourne (1969–84)

Gallery of works

References

Sources
 Goad, Philip James (1992), "The modern house in Melbourne, 1945-1975", PhD Thesis, Melbourne University.
Jennifer Taylor, Australian Architecture Since 1960, RAIA, 1990
 Philip Goad, A Guide to Melbourne Architecture, Sydney, 1999
 Geoffrey Serle, Robin Boyd: A Life, Melbourne, 1995
 Eric Westbrook, Birth of a Gallery, Macmillan Australia, Melbourne, 1968

 Conrad Hamann, Grounds, Sir Roy Burman (1905–1981), Australian Dictionary of Biography

1905 births
1981 deaths
Architects from Melbourne
Modernist architects
Modernist architecture in Australia
Australian Knights Bachelor
Recipients of the Royal Australian Institute of Architects’ Gold Medal
People educated at Scotch College, Melbourne
University of Melbourne alumni
20th-century Australian architects